Albers is a Dutch and Low German patronymic surname, meaning "Albert's son". Notable people with the surname include:

Academics
 Heinrich Albers-Schönberg (1865–1921), German gynecologist and radiologist
 :de:Johann Abraham Albers (1772–1821), German physician
 Johann Christian Albers (1795–1857), German physician and malacologist
 :de:Johann Friedrich Hermann Albers (1805–1867), German physician and pathologist
 Josef Albers (1888–1976), German artist, mathematician and educator
 Susanne Albers (born 1965), German computer scientist

Arts
 Anni Albers (1899–1994), German-American textile artist and printmaker
 Diana Albers, American comic book letterer
 :de:Eef Albers (born 1951), Dutch guitarist
 Hans Albers (1891–1960), German actor and singer
 :de:Henk Albers (1927–1987), Dutch comics artist and illustrator
 Henri Albers (1866–1926), born Johan Hendrik Albers, French operatic baritone of Dutch birth
 Hubertus Albers, (born 1965), German comedian
 Josef Albers (1888–1976), German-born American artist and educator
 Ken Albers (1924–2007), American singer who performed with The Four Freshmen, a male vocal band quartet
 Robin Albers (born 1958), Dutch house-music producer and DJ

Sports
 Andreas Albers (born 1990), Danish footballer
 Andrew Albers (born 1985), Canadian baseball pitcher
 Christijan Albers (born 1979), Dutch racing driver
 Jan Albers (born 1952), Dutch field hockey player
 Kristi Albers (born 1963), American golfer
 Marcel Albers (1967–1992), Dutch racing driver
 Matt Albers (born 1983), American baseball player
 Paul Albers (born 1985), Canadian ice hockey player

Politics, church and law
 James Albers, Canadian (Alberta) politician
 John Albers (born 1972), American (Georgia) politician
 Joseph H. Albers (1891–1965), American Roman Catholic bishop
 Karena Albers, American businesswoman and social entrepreneur
 Ronald E. Albers (born 1949), American judge
 Sheryl Albers (born 1954), American (Wisconsin) politician
 W. W. Albers (1860–1951), American politician

Other
 Albers Brothers Milling Company, a US west coast agricultural processing business

See also 
 Albers, Illinois, village in Clinton County, Illinois, United States
 Albers projection, conic, equal area map projection that uses two standard parallels
 Architype Albers, geometrically constructed stencil sans-serif typeface
 Aalbers
 Alberts (name)

References 

Dutch-language surnames
Low German surnames
Patronymic surnames
Surnames from given names